John Cripps may refer to:

 John Marten Cripps, English traveller and antiquarian
 John Cripps (journalist), British journalist
 John Cripps (horticulturalist), British-Australian horticulturalist

See also 
 John Cripps Pembrey Jnr